Berlin-Schöneweide is a railway station in Niederschöneweide, part of the Treptow-Köpenick borough of Berlin. It is served by the S-Bahn and regional trains, buses and trams. It was a terminal for long-distance trains until 2011.

History

The station was opened as a halt in the outskirts of the Landgemeinde (rural municipality) of Niederschöneweide on 24 May 1868 on the Berlin–Görlitz railway. Until 1874, it was called Neuer Krug (new tavern), the name of a nearby inn, after which it was renamed Neuer Krug-Johannisthal, after the rural municipality of Johannisthal, which was also near the station. In 1880–1882, it was rebuilt as a station.

	
As Niederschöneweide and Oberschöneweide were industrialising rapidly, a particularly high number of railways were built in the district. Apart from the state railways, these included tramways and a network of industrial railways called the Bullenbahn (bulls railway). In 1890/91, a branch line to Spindlersfeld was opened from the station. This was used for trials of electric suburban passenger trains between 1903 and 1906, although suburban electric trains were not introduced in Berlin until the construction of the S-Bahn in the 1920s.

The station was renamed in 1896 as Niederschöneweide-Johannisthal at the request of the municipality of Niederschöneweide because Niederschöneweide had provided finance for the branch to Spindlersfeld. Several private industrial railways connected to the rail network in Niederschöneweide. Private railways also connected in nearby Oberschöneweide, such as the line built in 1889 by Emil Rathenau to AEG-owned factories, using a wooden bridge over the Spree, which is at the current location of the Stubenrauch bridge.

Due to the dense traffic of the main line it was necessary to separate the traffic connecting to the private lines. At the same time, the long-distance and the suburban railway tracks were separated and Schöneweide station was upgraded in the course of this work to the six tracks it has today. This work was completed on 1 May 1906.

In the second phase of the introduction of electrical operations in Berlin, Schöneweide station gained a new approach from the other side of the station. The 'Great Electrification' continued over the branch line to Spindlersfeld and to Grünau. On 6 November 1928, the first electric S-Bahn train ran to the station. In 1929, the station was renamed to its current name of Schöneweide.

With the Second World War and the subsequent division of Berlin, the Görlitz line, which ran almost entirely through East Germany (GDR), lost access to its terminal station, the Görlitzer Bahnhof, which was in Kreuzberg, now in West Berlin, and could not now be reached. The long-distance trains serving the stations (as distinct from halts) on the Görlitz line in Berlin (Baumschulenweg, Schöneweide, Adlershof and Grünau) were gradually rerouted to Lichtenberg. Schöneweide became a long-distance terminal after the closure of long-distance operations at the other three stations. It was developed as the third major long-distance station in East Berlin (after Ostbahnhof, later called Berlin Hauptbahnhof (central station), and Lichtenberg). Traffic to the southern areas of the GDR began and ended there. The long-distance tracks connecting the station and central Berlin were closed as a result of the widening of the adjacent federal highway 96a to six lanes.

After German reunification long-distance services were gradually rerouted over the Stadtbahn or to Lichtenberg, although regional services were retained. Due to the need to rehabilitate a bridge at Ostkreuz station, regional trains, which had begun or ended at Lichtenberg were moved to Schöneweide. From the timetable change of 11 December 2011, regional transport services no longer operated to Schöneweide. The Ostdeutsche Eisenbahn service OE 36 trains from Frankfurt (Oder) via Königs Wusterhausen, which formerly terminated at Schöneweide, now run directly to Lichtenberg. Since April 2016, the regional service RB 24 has served the station, reintroducing regional trains to Schöneweide.

Train services
The station is served by the following service(s):

Local services  Eberswalde – Berlin – Königs Wusterhausen – Lübben – Senftenberg
Berlin S-Bahn services  (Bundesplatz - Innsbrucker Platz -) Südkreuz - Neukölln - Schöneweide - Berlin-Schönefeld Airport
Berlin S-Bahn services  Westend - Westkreuz - Innsbrucker Platz - Südkreuz - Neukölln - Schöneweide - Grünau - Königs Wusterhausen
Berlin S-Bahn services  Hermannstraße – Neukölln – Schöneweide – Spindlersfeld
Berlin S-Bahn services  Birkenwerder – Pankow – Prenzlauer Allee – Ostkreuz – Schöneweide – Grünau – Zeuthen
Berlin S-Bahn services  Pankow – Prenzlauer Allee – Ostkreuz – Schöneweide
Berlin S-Bahn services  Spandau - Westkreuz – Hauptbahnhof - Alexanderplatz – Ostbahnhof – Schöneweide – Flughafen Schönefeld

References

External links

Berlin S-Bahn stations
Railway stations in Treptow-Köpenick
Railway stations in Germany opened in 1868
1868 establishments in Prussia